The Sri Lankan cricket team toured India from 9 to 14 February 2016 to play three Twenty20 International matches. On 24 May 2015, the Board of Control for Cricket in India (BCCI) announced the venues for the series. They were played in Pune, Ranchi and Visakhapatnam. Initially Delhi was scheduled to host the second match, but the match was later moved to Ranchi. India won the series 2–1.

Squads

Niroshan Dickwella was added to Sri Lanka's squad as cover for Tillakaratne Dilshan, who was ruled out of the first match due to an injury. Shaminda Eranga replaced Binura Fernando due to a hamstring injury.

T20I series

1st T20I

2nd T20I

3rd T20I

References

External links
 Series home at ESPN Cricinfo

2016 in Sri Lankan cricket
2016 in Indian cricket
International cricket competitions in 2015–16
Sri Lankan cricket tours of India